The 2014 Pekao Szczecin Open was a professional tennis tournament played on clay courts. It was the 22nd edition of the tournament which was part of the 2014 ATP Challenger Tour. It took place in Szczecin, Poland between 8 and 14 September 2014.

Singles main-draw entrants

Seeds

 1 Rankings are as of September 1, 2014.

Other entrants
The following players received wildcards into the singles main draw:
  Cristian Garín
  Kamil Majchrzak
  Grzegorz Panfil
  Rafal Teurer

The following player received entry as a special exemption into the singles main draw:
  Guillaume Rufin

The following players received entry from the qualifying draw:
  Mateusz Kowalczyk 
  Błażej Koniusz 
  Philipp Davydenko
  Marcin Gawron

Champions

Singles

  Dustin Brown def.  Jan-Lennard Struff, 6–4, 6–3

Doubles

 Dustin Brown /  Jan-Lennard Struff def.  Tomasz Bednarek /  Igor Zelenay, 6–2, 6–4

External links
Official Website

Pekao Szczecin Open
Pekao Szczecin Open
Pekao